Deeksha Joshi is an Indian actress from Gujarat who primarily works in the Gujarati film industry. She made her acting debut in 2017 with the film Shubh Aarambh, followed by Karsandas Pay & Use (2017), Sharato Lagu (2018), Dhunki (2019).

Early life 
Deeksha was born in Lucknow, Uttar Pradesh as the daughter of Hem Joshi and Rashmi Joshi. Later her family moved to Ahmedabad, she did her schooling from Eklavya School, Ahmedabad and studied English Literature from St. Xavier's College, Ahmedabad

Career 
Deeksha debuted with the movie Shubh Aarambh, directed by Amit Barot in 2017. She then starred in other two movies Karsandas Pay & Use and Colorbaaj in the same year. Karsandas Pay & Use was her first Commercially successful film.

Her next project was Sharato Lagu alongside Malhar Thakkar. This was also a commercial success. She won the GIFA best actress of the year in 2018 for her role in Sharato Lagu. The film and her performance was both critically and commercially acclaimed. Her next venture was Dhunki starring with Pratik Gandhi which was acclaimed critically. In 2020, Deeksha received the Critics' Choice Film Awards Best Actress (Gujarati) for Dhunki. Deeksha did the titular role in the romantic comedy film Luv Ni Love Storys directed by Durgesh Tanna which was also released in 2020.

She will make her Hindi Film debut with the Ranveer Singh starrer Jayeshbhai Jordaar directed by Divyang Thakkar. She will be also seeing in Chandresh Bhatt's untitled venture opposite Esha Kansara and Gaurav Paswala.

Filmography

Awards

References

External links 
 
 
 
 

Living people
Indian film actresses
Actresses from Ahmedabad
Actresses in Gujarati cinema
Gujarati people
Actresses from Lucknow
Year of birth missing (living people)